The Women's keirin was one of the 5 women's events at the 2010 European Track Championships, held in Pruszków, Poland.

21 cyclists participated in the contest.

The event was held on November 7.

First round
First 2 riders in each heat qualified for the second round, remainder to first round repechage.

Heat 1

Heat 2

Heat 3

First Round Repechage
First 2 rider in each heat qualified for the second round.

Heat 1

Heat 2

Heat 3

Second round
First 3 riders in each heat qualified for the final 1- 6 and the others to final 7 - 12.

Heat 1

Heat 2

Finals

Final 7-12 places

Final

References

First Round Results
First Round Repechage Results
Second Round Results
Final Results

Women's keirin
European Track Championships – Women's keirin